A telephone is a telecommunication device which is used to transmit and receive sound simultaneously.

Telephone may also refer to:

Telecommunications
 AT&T, sometimes called "Telephone" due to its U.S. ticker symbol "T" on the New York Stock Exchange
 Camera phone, a mobile phone that is also able to capture either still photographs or video
 Cordless telephone, a telephone with a wireless handset that communicates via radio waves to its base station
 Mobile phone, a wireless telecommunications device used for phone and data calls over a cellular network 
 Smartphone, a mobile phone and a handheld personal computer.
 Radiotelephone or radiophone, a telephone that allows two or more people to talk via radio, often referring to an older radio telephone system that predated modern mobile (cellular) phones
 Softphone, a software program for making telephone calls over the Internet using computers
 Telephone (application), a softphone telecommunication app for Mac OS X, by Alexei Kuznetsov
 Tin can telephone, a type of voice-transmitting device usually made from two tin cans and string or wire
 Videophone, telephones with video displays, which enable their users to see each other as well in real time

Music
 Téléphone, a French rock band formed in 1976

Albums
 Telephone (album), a 1984 live album by Ron Carter and Jim Hall
 Téléphone (album), a 1977 album by Téléphone
 The Telephone Album, a 1998 album by Lotion

Songs
 "Telephone" (song), a 2010 song by Lady Gaga and Beyoncé
 "Telephone", by Chaka Khan on her album The Woman I Am, 1992
 "Telephone", by Diana Ross from the album Swept Away, 1984
 "Telephone", by Erykah Badu on her album New Amerykah Part One (4th World War), 2008
 "Telephone", by Waterparks on their album Fandom, 2019
 "Telephone (Won't You Ring)", a 1962 song by Shelley Fabares

Other uses
 Telephone (game), also known as Chinese whispers
 Telephone game (game theory), a concept in game theory
 Telephone (sternwheeler), a steamboat in Oregon in the late 19th and early 20th centuries
 Telephone, Texas, an unincorporated community in Fannin County, Texas
 Telephone Road, a major street in Houston, Texas, USA

See also
 Phone (disambiguation)
 The Telephone (disambiguation)
 Telefone (disambiguation)
 Telefon (disambiguation)